Coopersburg is a borough in Lehigh County, Pennsylvania, United States. The population of Coopersburg was 2,447 as of the 2020 census.

Coopersburg is part of the Lehigh Valley metropolitan area, which had a population of 861,899 and was the 68th most populous metropolitan area in the U.S. as of the 2020 census.

Geography
Coopersburg is located at  (40.510262, -75.389901). The borough is mostly surrounded by Upper Saucon Township, with two portions in the southeast touching Springfield Township in Bucks County.

Demographics

As of the census of 2010, there were 2,386 people living in the borough. The racial makeup of the borough was 95.7% White, 0.6% African American, 0.1% Native American, 1.1% Asian, 0.0% Pacific Islander, 0.9% from other races, and 1.5% from two or more races. Hispanic or Latino of any race were 3.5% of the population.

As of the census of 2000, there were 2,582 people, 983 households, and 671 families living in the borough. The population density was 2,780.7 people per square mile (1,072.0/km²). There were 1,050 housing units at an average density of 1,130.8 per square mile (435.9/km²). The racial makeup of the borough was 96.01% White, 0.70% African American, 0.08% Native American, 1.70% Asian, 0.04% Pacific Islander, 0.46% from other races, and 1.01% from two or more races. Hispanic or Latino of any race were 1.78% of the population.

There were 983 households, out of which 29.3% had children under the age of 18 living with them, 54.5% were married couples living together, 9.4% had a female householder with no husband present, and 31.7% were non-families. 26.7% of all households were made up of individuals, and 11.1% had someone living alone who was 65 years of age or older. The average household size was 2.46 and the average family size was 2.99.

In the borough, the population was spread out, with 21.6% under the age of 18, 7.6% from 18 to 24, 26.4% from 25 to 44, 23.7% from 45 to 64, and 20.7% who were 65 years of age or older. The median age was 41 years. For every 100 females there were 94.4 males. For every 100 females age 18 and over, there were 88.0 males. The median income for a household in the borough was $43,603, and the median income for a family was $51,935. Males had a median income of $36,938 versus $29,545 for females. The per capita income for the borough was $21,689. About 2.8% of families and 2.9% of the population were below the poverty line, including 1.1% of those under age 18 and 4.5% of those age 65 or over.

History
Coopersburg was settled in about 1730. It originally was named Freyburg after local tavern owner and judge Joseph Frey. By the time the town was incorporated, it had been renamed Coopersburg, named after Judge Peter Cooper. The town was once the site of famous cattle sales at the estate of Tilghman S. Cooper.

Education 
Along with Upper Saucon and Lower Milford Townships, Coopersburg is served by the Southern Lehigh School District. There are two elementary schools in the district serving kindergarten through third grades, Liberty Bell and Hopewell. The Joseph P. Liberati Intermediate School serves fourth through sixth grades. There is one middle school that houses seventh and eighth graders. The district has one high school, Southern Lehigh High School, for students in ninth through 12th grades.

Transportation

Pennsylvania Route 309 is the only numbered highway passing through Coopersburg. It follows Third Street along a north-south alignment through the eastern portion of the borough.

Notable people

Chuck Bednarik, former professional football player, Philadelphia Eagles, and member of Pro Football Hall of Fame
John Grogan, author of Marley and Me
John Myung, bassist and founding member of Dream Theater
Mike Portnoy, founding member and former drummer for Dream Theater
Elizabeth Price, former gymnast, alternate to U.S. 2012 Olympic gymnastics team
Donald L. Ritter, former Member of Congress
Jimmie Schaffer, former professional baseball catcher, Chicago Cubs, Chicago White Sox, Cincinnati Reds, Philadelphia Phillies, and St. Louis Cardinals
Justin Simmons, former Pennsylvania State of Representative

References

External links

1730 establishments in Pennsylvania
Boroughs in Lehigh County, Pennsylvania
Boroughs in Pennsylvania
Populated places established in 1730